is a Japanese anime television series animated by Toei Animation. It aired on TBS from March 4, 1984, to February 3, 1985. It is also referred to as Rezarion, Laserion and its literal translation Video Senshi Laserion. It was broadcast in Latin America as El Super Lasser.

In South Korea, a pirated version was made based on the Japanese footage and aired under the title Video Ranger 007.

Overview

Story
The anime is set in the future where the Earth is unified under a world government called the Earth Federation; and is centered on young middle school student Takashi Katori and his classmate/best friend/love interest, Olivia Lawrence. Takashi, who began as a mere online game fan, developed a small virtual world with his friend David from New York City, in which they played their robot combat game. They would play by sending data to each other using satellite technology. One day while they were playing, a scientific experiment using the same satellite was being conducted involving teleporting an American plane from New York to Japan. In a freak accident caused by an explosion during a rebellion by people of the moon who attacked Earth, the plane that was converted into digital information was sent to the virtual world while Takashi's robot information was rematerialized into a real robot.

Takashi was arrested, but later the Earth Government discovered that Dr. Godheim, an evil, broken-hearted genius scientist from the Moon (now a sort of abandoned colony with restricted access) was behind the revolt. The government forces Takashi to pilot the virtual robot Laserion and protect the Earth alongside robot pilots Sarah and Charles and their G1 and G2 robots.

Soon things change, due to the entry of an extraterrestrial named Erefan. He has been captured by the Earth forces and brought in to answer their questions about who he is, and what kind of mission he was carrying. But Erefan proves he is benevolent, somehow refusing to talk about his past. But Olivia with her kindness and intellect helps him to express his suppressed recollections, the way was her encouragement to him to draw on a notebook.

It's the arrival of the extraterrestrial Jack Empire makes all things very complicated (episode 26), Erefan reveals he knows them, and a lot about their evil thinking, tactics and goals. Plus he was dragged to the pits, he witnessed their cruelty, and the Jack prime minister in the Hall of Throne. The specific notebook (containing his drawings) where the Jacks are illustrated about their appearances, mecha, and behavior. Everyone sees these images: Blueheim, General Sylvester, Takashi, Olivia, Charles Danner, and Sarah see what he had experienced, thus they realizing the dire danger the Jacks bring. So he enters the Earth mecha forces (particularly on the good side of Takashi, Charles, and Sarah) to help out the people of Earth against the Jacks as the pilot of the newly made G5 robot.

For Takashi as well, the war against the Jacks becomes personal as he and Olivia have fallen in love, only for her father Steve (who has been brainwashed through torture into becoming a Jack minion) to take her away and effectively let her be kidnapped by the Jacks. From Episodes 34 to 42 Takashi and Olivia are thus separated. Takashi follows the Jacks and the Lawrences to Kyoto, then to Africa (the jungles of East Africa and then the Sahara Desert, where Sahara's sister Sofia attempts to help them by blowing up the Jacks' base, only for them to move toward the Moon, as well as an attempt by Olivia to escape with her father, only to be thwarted by Gario, pulled in by her brainwashed father and locked up in a cell in the Jacks' fortress, separating them again). In Episode 42, seeing how Takashi's fury is making Laserion destroy their base and lose a lot of robots, Gario lets her go over Jack grunts' orders and they are reunited.

After several skirmishes and intense fights between Earth and Jack forces (including an ultimate duel between Takashi and Gario on their robots) the Earthlings win the war on the moon and finally rescue all the hostages remaining, including Steve, who is last seen recovering with his daughter's help. Erefan with his space craft in full capacity, thanks to the efforts of the scientists, bids farewell to his Earth friends, and departs for his home world in episode 45.

Laserion
Height: 35 meters; Weight: 200 metric tons.

Being a robot originating in virtual reality, Laserion incorporates various abilities and techniques out of the ordinary for giant robots, including the ability to teleport at will to avoid attacks, and conjure weapons out of nowhere. All weapons are summoned to materialize.

Fists: Laserion's hands can both physically and electrically (shock) punch foes and things.
Beam Bazooka/Rifle: Laserion's main firearm.
Laser Sword: Laserion's means of splitting foes in two. It incorporates Takashi's own Kendo abilities. The handle can also summon a Rod and a Whip. 
Laser Cutters: Shuriken/throwing stars.
Laser Battle Gear: Additional armor gained after Episode 28 to fight against Gario Sabang, a robot from the Jaku Empire built to be a counter to Laserion. Resembling an American football helmet and padding, it increases the power of the existing weapons and adds new ones.

Laserion can also transform into two modes: a jet fighter plane capable of space flight, and a tank. However, the "transformation" is done by disassembling and reassembling Laserion's parts in virtual reality, as opposed to simply folding and locking, as in Transformers and many other such anime robots of the era.

Staff
 Planner: Itaru Orita, Hiroshi Kominato. (Episodes 1-23), Susumu Yoshikawa (Episodes 24–45)
 Original Creator: Saburo Yatsude
 Music by: Michiaki Watanabe
 Theme Song Writer: Chuumei Watanabe
 Theme Song Performance Opening "Video Senshi Laserion": Takayuki Miyauchi
 Theme Song Performance Ending "Heartful Hotline": Kumiko Kaori
 Character Draft: Shinji Imura
 Character Design: Hideyuki Motohashi
 Mechanical Design: Kamio Ohara (Kaname Prodcuton), Akira Hio, Koichi Ohata
 Planning Cooperation: Momiji Akino, Satoshi Konishi (Y&K)
 Art Settings: Fumihiro Uchikawa
 Chief Director: Kozo Morishita
 In Charge of Production: Tokiji Kabuki
 Produced by: Toei Animation, Asatsu-DK

Characters

Main protagonists

Earth Federation and other allies

Rebel Army



Episodes

Media
Video Warrior Laserion officially received its first release on DVD on March 11, 2020, in two volumes with a retail price of 22,000 yen (US$202). Volume 1 covered episodes 1-22, while volume 2 covered episodes 23–45. The series will have a Blu-ray release in North America in 2021 by Discotek Media.

Notes

References

External links
 
 

1984 anime television series debuts
1985 Japanese television series endings
Discotek Media
Japanese drama television series
Super robot anime and manga
Television shows about virtual reality
Toei Animation television
TBS Television (Japan) original programming